A Hole in Space (U.K. edition ) is a collection of nine science fiction short stories and one essay, all by Larry Niven, published in 1974. This 1975 winner of the Locus Poll Award, Best Single Author Collection (place: second) includes:

 "Rammer" (this story had later become part of the novel A World Out of Time)
 "The Alibi Machine"
 "The Last Days of the Permanent Floating Riot Club"
 "A Kind of Murder"
 "All the Bridges Rusting"
 "There Is a Tide" 
 "Bigger Than Worlds" (essay)
 "$16,940.00"
 "The Hole Man"
 "The Fourth Profession"

Explanatory footnotes

References 

1974 short story collections
Ballantine Books books
Short story collections by Larry Niven